Neven Spahija (born 6 November 1962) is a Croatian professional basketball coach who was most recently the head coach for Bitci Baskonia of the Liga ACB. He spent four years in the NBA as an assistant coach with the Atlanta Hawks and Memphis Grizzlies.

Coaching career

Club career
Spahija started his basketball coaching career with Gradine Pula from Croatia and Olimpija Ljubljana from Slovenia, working as an assistant coach. He started his head coaching career with Cibona from Croatia, where he won his first league championship in 2001. He then worked with Krka Novo Mesto from Slovenia, Avtodor Saratov from Russia, Lietuvos rytas from Lithuania, Maccabi Tel Aviv from Israel, and Baskonia and Valencia from Spain. 

From 2010 to 2012, he was the head coach of Turkish team Fenerbahçe Ülker. In June 2013, he was named the head coach of Cibona, for the next four years. In November 2013, he parted ways with Cibona.

On 4 August 2014, Spahija was hired by the Atlanta Hawks, to be their assistant coach. 

On 26 June 2017, Spahija returned to Maccabi Tel Aviv for a second stint, signing a 2+1-year contract. In the 2017–18 season, Spahija led Maccabi to win the 2017–18 Israeli League championship. On 18 November 2018, he parted ways with the club after four consecutive losses and a 1–6 start to the 2018–19 EuroLeague season.

In August 2019, Spahija was hired by the Memphis Grizzlies, to be their assistant coach, where he spent the 2019–20 season. On 13 September 2020, Spahija left the Grizzlies to coach overseas. On 20 September, he signed as head coach of the Shanghai Sharks of the Chinese Basketball Association (CBA).

National team career
Spahija led the senior Croatian national basketball team between 2001 and 2005, coaching them at the 2003 and 2005 European Championship tournaments.

Coaching record

EuroLeague

|- 
| align="left" rowspan=2|Cibona Zagreb
| align="left"|2000–01
| 12 || 3 || 9 ||  || align="center"|Eliminated in Top 16 stage
|- 
| align="left"|2001–02
| 6 || 2 || 4 ||  || align="center"|Fired
|- 
| align="left"|Krka
| align="left"|2001–02
| 5 || 4 || 1 ||  || align="center"|Eliminated in regular season
|- 
| align="left"|Lietuvos rytas
| align="left"|2005–06
| 20 || 11 || 9 ||  || align="center"|Eliminated in Top 16 stage
|- 
| align="left"|Maccabi Tel Aviv
| align="left"|2006–07
| 23 || 13 || 10 ||  || align="center"|Eliminated in quarterfinals
|- 
| align="left"|Tau Cerámica
| align="left"|2007–08
| 25 || 16 || 9 ||  || align="center"|Lost in 3rd place game
|- 
| align="left" rowspan=2|Fenerbahçe Ülker
| align="left"|2010–11
| 16 || 10 || 6 ||  || align="center"|Eliminated in Top 16 stage
|- 
| align="left"|2011–12
| 16 || 8 || 8 ||  || align="center"|Eliminated in Top 16 stage
|- 
| align="left" rowspan=2|Maccabi Tel Aviv
| align="left"|2017–18
| 30 || 13 || 17 ||  || align="center"|Eliminated in Top 16 stage
|- 
| align="left"|2018–19
| 7 || 1 || 6 ||  || align="center"|Fired
|- 
|-class="sortbottom"
| align="center" colspan=2|Career||160||81||79||||

See also
 List of foreign NBA coaches

References

External links
ACB.com Profile 
Euroleague.net Profile

Living people
1962 births
Atlanta Hawks assistant coaches
Basketbol Süper Ligi head coaches
BC Rytas coaches
Croatian basketball coaches
Croatian expatriate basketball people in Italy
Croatian expatriate basketball people in Spain
Croatian expatriate basketball people in Turkey
Croatian expatriate basketball people in the United States
Fenerbahçe basketball coaches
KK Cibona coaches
KK Krka coaches
Liga ACB head coaches
Maccabi Tel Aviv B.C. coaches
Memphis Grizzlies assistant coaches
Saski Baskonia coaches
Valencia Basket coaches
ŽKK Šibenik coaches